The An-24 Crash in Navoiy came March 23, 1991. An-24 belonged to Aeroflot airline. The plane crashed in Navoiy airport during landing. 34 people lost their lives.

Airplane 
The An-24 aircraft with serial number 27307910 was produced in July 1972 by Antonov plant under serial number 079-10. It was handed over to the Ministry of Civil Aviation of the USSR under registration number . It was sent to the Samarkand United Detachment of the Civil Aviation Administration of Uzbekistan until August 18.

Crash 
The plane was flying from Tashkent to Navoiy with 4 crew members and 59 passengers.

On approach, the crew did not follow the landing pattern and gave false information to the controller, stating that they were following the controller's orders. As a result, the aircraft was at an altitude of 3,000 meters when it was 19 kilometers from the runway. The crew reported that it was at an altitude of 2,100 meters, 23 kilometers from the runway. Unaware of the actual situation, the controller allowed them to descend to 1,500 meters, after which the pilot brought the aircraft into a steep descent at a vertical speed of 20 m/s, while airspeed increased up to 450 km / h. At 2,400 meters, 18 kilometers from the runway, the pilots reported that they were at 1,500 meters and were making an approach. In response, the controller cleared them to descend to 600 meters in the third turn, so the crew turned 29° to the right, then left, entering a 252° landing course.

References 

1991 in Uzbekistan
Accidents and incidents involving the Antonov An-24
Aviation accidents and incidents in 1991
Aviation accidents and incidents in Uzbekistan